Aphthonius of Antioch was a Greek sophist and rhetorician who lived in the second half of the 4th century CE.

Life

No information about his personal life is available except for his friendship with the sophist Libanius and a certain Eutropius, who may have been the author of a Roman history epitome.

Aphthonius is known for his work Progymnasmata, a textbook on rhetoric and its elements, including exercises for students before they entered formal rhetorical schools. This work served as an introduction to the techne of Hermogenes of Tarsus. Aphthonius's writing style is characterized as pure and simple, and ancient critics praised his atticism. The Progymnasmata remained popular as late as the 17th century, particularly in Germany. A collection of 40 fables written in the style of Aesop is also attributed to Aphthonius.

Aphthonius may have visited the Serapeum of Alexandria around 315 CE, according to Rowe and Rees.

References

Further reading
 , Progymnasmata Apthonii sophistae Graece (1626)
 Edition of the fables by Francesco de Furia (1810)
 Leonhard von Spengel, Rhetores Graeci, vol.2 (1856), p. 21f.  Google books here. - The page numbers from this are used in subsequent texts for reference, according to Kennedy p. 95.
 Christoph Eberhard Finckh, Aphthonii et Nicolai Progymnasmata sophistarum progymnasmata (1865)
 Oskar Philipp Hoppichler, De Theone, Hermogene, Aphthonique Pro-gymnasmatum Scriptoribus (1884)
 Hugo Rabe, Leipzig: Teubner (1926) - modern critical edition
 Ray Nadeau, Speech Monographs 19 (1952), p. 264–85 - English translation.  Revised version in Readings from Classical Rhetoric, ed. Patricia P. Matsen &c, p. 266–288.
 George Alexander Kennedy, Progymnasmata: Greek textbooks of prose composition and rhetoric, pp. 95f. - English translation.  Preview on Google Books here.
 Malcolm Heath, Aphthonius Progymnasmata (1997).  Online English translation, but does not include all the material at the end given by Kennedy.

People from Antioch
Roman-era Sophists
Atticists
4th-century writers
4th-century births
Year of death unknown